Bettada Huli is a 1965 Kannada-language action drama film, directed and written by A. V. Sheshagiri Rao.
The film was dubbed in Tamil in 1968 as Kolaikaaran Magan.

Plot
A bandit, played by Udaykumar kidnaps the pregnant wife of City Cop, K. S. Ashwath. The Cop's wife delivers a baby boy under the Bandit's custody. However, the bandit's wife conceives a baby girl, hands it over to Ashwath. Before dying, she urges Ashwath to bring her daughter away from her father.

The bandit instills in the little boy that he is the bandit's son and his own mother is his maternal aunt. The Cop's son is brought up to be a bandit, much against his will. The bandit's daughter, though, has a chaste upbringing, is always in awe of robbers and thieves, admiring them for their dare-devilry.

Due for his first robbery, the son meets his biological father in a fare and has an unexplained attraction towards him. He has to rob jewels from the Cop's daughter Jayanthi, but he hesitates to do it. Jayanthi herself offers all the jewels and plays coy, before her father.

As the movie proceeds, the son, increasingly known as Bettada Kalla is pitted against the father and only one can survive. Will the son know the truth and unite his parents? This forms the crux of the movie.

Cast 
 Rajkumar as Raju
 Jayanthi 
 Pandari Bai as Parvati
 Udaykumar
 K. S. Ashwath
 M. P. Shankar  
 Narasimharaju
 B. Jaya

Soundtrack 
The music was composed by T. G. Lingappa, with lyrics by Geethapriya. All the songs composed for the film were received extremely well and considered as evergreen songs.

Tamil

References

External links 
 

1965 films
1960s action drama films
1960s Kannada-language films
Indian action drama films
Indian black-and-white films
Films scored by T. G. Lingappa
1965 directorial debut films
Films directed by A. V. Seshagiri Rao
1965 drama films